Seku is a masculine given name. Notable people with the name include:

 Seku Amadu (1773–1845), Malian imam
 Seku Conneh (born 1995), Liberian footballer
 Seku Ture (1922–1984), President of Guinea

See also
 Sekou

Masculine given names